John Hagelou "Jack" Burmaster (December 23, 1926 – September 28, 2005) was an  American basketball player and coach.

He played collegiately for the University of Illinois at Urbana-Champaign. While at Illinois, Burmaster played the 1945 season with two notable future coaches, Johnny Orr and Vic Bubas.

He was selected by the St. Louis Bombers in the 1948 BAA Draft.

Burmaster, at 6-foot-3 and 190 pounds, began his professional career with the Oshkosh All-Stars of the National Basketball League during the 1948–49 season. He scored 360 points, fifth best on the team, in playing all 64 games for the All-Stars, who won the Western Division championship with a 37–27 record, one game ahead of the Tri-Cities Blackhawks and two ahead of the Sheboygan Red Skins. The All-Stars were defeated by the Anderson Packers in the NBL finals.

When Oshkosh folded soon after the NBL merged with the Basketball Association of America in 1949, he joined Sheboygan of the newly minted NBA. Burmaster became one of Sheboygan's best all-around players. Tenacious on defense, he was equally tough on offense, averaging 9.8 points per game (598 points in 61 games). He was the Red Skins' fourth-leading scorer.

In 1950–51, after Sheboygan was kicked out of the NBA, Burmaster continued to star for the Red Skins of the National Professional Basketball League, scoring 467 points in 42 games, an average of 11.1 points per game. He was named to the NPBL's second team and Sheboygan finished with the league's best record at 29–16.

Burmaster was head basketball coach at duPont Manual High School in Louisville, Kentucky for one season, 1951–52, finishing runner-up in the state championship to Cuba High School.

From 1952–75, Burmaster was head basketball coach at Evanston Township High School in Evanston, Illinois, where his record of 362–145 included the 1968 Illinois state high school championship. He served as athletic director at the school from 1975–85.

In 2006, Burmaster was voted as one of the 100 Legends of the IHSA Boys Basketball Tournament, a group of former players and coaches in honor of the 100 anniversary of the IHSA boys basketball tournament.

Honors

Basketball
 1946 – 2nd team All-Big Ten
 1946 – Honorable Mention All-American
 1948 – Team Captain
 1948 – 2nd team All-Big Ten
 1948 – Team Most Valuable Player
 1948 – Honorable Mention All-American
 1973 – Inducted into the Illinois Basketball Coaches Association's Hall of Fame as a player.
 2007 – Named one of the 100 Legends of the IHSA Boys Basketball Tournament.

Statistics

College

NBA career statistics

Regular season

Playoffs

References

External links

 
 

1926 births
2005 deaths
Basketball coaches from Illinois
Basketball players from Illinois
High school basketball coaches in Illinois
Illinois Fighting Illini men's basketball players
Oshkosh All-Stars players
Sheboygan Red Skins players
St. Louis Bombers (NBA) draft picks
Sportspeople from Elgin, Illinois
Guards (basketball)
American men's basketball players
High school basketball coaches in Kentucky